The Embassy of Romania in Ottawa is the diplomatic mission of Romania to Canada, located at 655 Rideau Street in Lower Town, Ottawa, Ontario.

History 
The Embassy of Romania in Ottawa was established in 1970. In 1991, the Consulate General of Romania opened in Toronto, while the consulate general in Montreal resumed its initial status.

Liviu Maior was the ambassador between 2002-2005, and Elena Ştefoi between 2005-2012. On June 10, 2013, Maria Ligor presented her credentials to David Johnston, Governor General of Canada, at Rideau Hall, in Ottawa.

In 2011, Romania opened a consulate general in Vancouver. There is an honorary consulate general in Moncton, and an honorary consulate in Quebec City.

Ambassadors

Canadian-Romanian relations 

Formal Canada–Romania relations were established on August 16, 1919 when the Consulate General of Romania was established in Montreal by Vasile Stoica. Before, the consulate worked without the consent of Canadian authorities.

Bilateral relations at the embassy level were initiated on April 3, 1967.

See also
Romanian diplomatic missions 
Embassy of Canada in Bucharest
Canadians of Romanian descent

References

External links
 Official Website

Ottawa
Romania
1970 establishments in Ontario
Canada–Romania relations